Non-protein nitrogen (or NPN) is a term used in animal nutrition to refer collectively to components such as urea, biuret, and ammonia, which are not proteins but can be converted into proteins by microbes in the ruminant stomach. Due to their lower cost compared to plant and animal proteins, their inclusion in a diet can result in economic gain, but at too high levels cause a depression in growth and possible ammonia toxicity, as microbes convert NPN to ammonia first before using that to make protein. 

NPN can also be used to artificially raise crude protein values, which are measured based on nitrogen content, as protein is about 16% nitrogen and the only major component of most food which contains nitrogen is protein. The source of NPN is typically a chemical feed additive, or sometimes chicken waste and cattle manure.

See also
 Nitrogen cycle
 Cyanamide
 Cyanuric acid
 Melamine
 1,3,5-Triazine
 Triazines
 Chinese protein export contamination

References

Agricultural chemicals
Fertilizers
Adulteration
Food safety
Nitrogen
Nitrogen cycle